The 2011-12 Austrian National League season was contested by 12 teams, and saw HC Innsbruck win the championship. The top eight teams from the regular season qualified for the playoffs. One Hungarian team, DAB-Docler participated in the league.

Regular season

Playoffs

External links
Season on hockeyarchives.info

Austrian National League
2011–12 in Austrian ice hockey leagues
Austrian National League seasons